Krzysztof Drzazga (born 20 June 1995) is a Polish professional footballer who plays as a forward for Podbeskidzie Bielsko-Biała.

Career

Club
Drzazga scored his first goal for Wisła Kraków on 9 August 2016 in a Polish Cup match against Zagłębie Sosnowiec.

On 9 March 2019 he scored his first goals in the Ekstraklasa by scoring a hat-trick in a 6–2 victory against Korona Kielce. He followed that up by scoring the opening goal in a 3–2 victory over Cracovia.

On 31 July 2020 he signed a two-year contract with Miedź Legnica.

On 26 May 2022, Drzazga moved to another I liga side Podbeskidzie Bielsko-Biała on a two-year deal.

Honours
Miedź Legnica
I liga: 2021–22

References

External links
 

1995 births
People from Szprotawa
Sportspeople from Lubusz Voivodeship
Living people
Polish footballers
Association football forwards
KS Polkowice players
Wisła Kraków players
Stal Mielec players
Chojniczanka Chojnice players
Puszcza Niepołomice players
Miedź Legnica players
Podbeskidzie Bielsko-Biała players
Ekstraklasa players
I liga players
II liga players
III liga players